The East Kilbride News is a Scottish newspaper covering the East Kilbride area. It is the longest-running newspaper in the town. The paper is currently owned by Reach plc.

History
The East Kilbride News began in 1952, and is the longest serving local newspaper for the East Kilbride area.

It first started out of a small office in nearby Cambuslang, and was sold for 2d. It later opened an office in the town in 1967, though it took the form of a small counter in the W and R Holmes bookshop, which was situated in Righead Gate, with a couple of small rooms upstairs. Around 15 months later, the East Kilbride News was one of the first firms to move into what would become the Olympia Arcade of the East Kilbride Shopping Centre. They remained there until July 2009, where the Scottish and Universal Newspapers centralise their South Lanarkshire Operations, including the Hamilton Advertiser and Rutherglen Reformer, into an office in Hamilton.

External links 
East Kilbride News Website
"East Kilbride News" Facebook Page
"East Kilbride News" Twitter

Newspapers published in Scotland
1952 establishments in Scotland
Newspapers established in 1952
Newspapers published by Reach plc